Richard Meyer, also known as Swayd (born in Lausanne, Switzerland in November 1970), is a record producer and songwriter of pop music and electronic music.

Besides his activity at Lunar Sound oriented in film scores, advertising music and sound design, he has worked with Mutt Lange in productions such as Britney Spears ("Don't Let Me Be the Last to Know"), The Corrs, ("Breathless" (UK #1, hitting the charts all over the world), "Irresistible" and "All The Love In The World"), Celine Dion ("If Walls Could Talk") and Shania Twain, and as a remixer for The Young Gods. He also produced and recorded the successful single "Lucky" (#3 CH) for Bastian Baker.

Discography 

Dragonhunter was the number one song by Meyer
If Walls Could Talk, Celine Dion
Don't Let Me Be the Last to Know (Import CD EP), Britney Spears
Oops!...I Did It Again, Britney Spears
Baby One More Time/Oops!...I Did It Again, Britney Spears
Oops!...I Did It Again (Japan Bonus Track 2), Britney Spears
America's Sweethearts, Original Soundtrack
Breathless, The Corrs
All The Love In The World, The Corrs
Irresistible, The Corrs
Best of the Corrs (Australia Bonus Track), The Corrs
Best of the Corrs, The Corrs
In Blue (Australia Bonus Track CD), The Corrs
In Blue (DVD-Audio),  The Corrs
Up!, Shania Twain
Shakti Shanti, Swayd
Cafe Buddha 2, Swayd
Beyond Borders, Swayd
Beyond Bollywood, Swayd
Top 40 Ultimate Asian Classic Bar Grooves, Swayd
Lucky, Bastian Baker

See also

Robert John "Mutt" Lange.
Swayd
In Blue, The Corrs.
The Best of The Corrs.
Oops!… I Did It Again, Britney Spears.
All the Way… A Decade of Song, Celine Dion.
Up!, Shania Twain.

External links 
Lunarsound.com
Swaydmusic.com

1970 births
Living people
Swiss record producers
People from Lausanne
Date of birth missing (living people)